The 3rd Bodil Awards ceremony was held in 1950 in Copenhagen, Denmark, honouring the best national and foreign films of 1949. The event had moved from Palace Hotel's night club Ambassadeur to a local cinema where All the King's Men had its Danish premiere as part of the celebrations.

Torben Anton Svendsen's film Susanne won the award for Best Danish Film. Erik Mørk and Astrid Villaume won the awards for Best Actor and Actress in a Leading Role for their performances in the same film.

Winners

See also 
 Robert Awards

References

External links 
 Official website

1949 film awards
1950 in Denmark
Bodil Awards ceremonies
1950s in Copenhagen